Federal is a village in the Northern Rivers region of New South Wales, Australia.

History 
The village was originally known as Jaspar, until it was cleared for the use of agriculture in the 19th century. 

Over the last years, Federal has seen settlers revitalize new services and endures as a quaint village for its rural lifestyle.

References 

Towns in New South Wales
Northern Rivers